Hemiancistrus fuliginosus is a species of catfish in the family Loricariidae. It is native to South America, where it occurs in the Uruguay River basin. The species reaches 16.2 cm (6.4 inches) SL.

References 

Ancistrini
Fish described in 1999